Boelens is a surname. Notable people with the surname include:

Larry Boelens (1942–1988), American television lighting consultant, electrician, gaffer, and photographer
Mischa Boelens (born 1995), Curaçao footballer
 Boelens Loen, patrician family of Amsterdam, Dutch Republic

See also
Boelen
Boeyens